The Hamburg Kammerspiele (German: Hamburger Kammerspiele) is a private theatre in Rotherbaum, Hamburg, Germany, in the borough of Eimsbüttel.

References

External links
 Official website
 Hamburg Kammerspiele Logensaal

Theatres in Hamburg
Buildings and structures in Eimsbüttel